Israel competed at the 2020 Summer Paralympics in Tokyo from 24 August to 5 September 2021. The delegation includes 33 athletes  18 women and 15 men  competing in 11 sports: athletics, badminton, boccia, goalball, paracanoeing, powerlifting, rowing, shooting, swimming, table tennis, and wheelchair tennis.

The Games were originally scheduled to take place between 25 August and 6 September 2020, but were postponed because of the COVID-19 pandemic. They are still being called the 2020 Summer Paralympics, even with the change in scheduling to one year later.

Disability classifications

Every participant at the Paralympics has their disability grouped into one of five disability categories; amputation, the condition may be congenital or sustained through injury or illness; cerebral palsy; wheelchair athletes, there is often overlap between this and other categories; visual impairment, including blindness; Les autres, any physical disability that does not fall strictly under one of the other categories, for example dwarfism or multiple sclerosis. Each Paralympic sport then has its own classifications, dependent upon the specific physical demands of competition. Events are given a code, made of numbers and letters, describing the type of event and classification of the athletes competing. Some sports, such as athletics, divide athletes by both the category and severity of their disabilities, other sports, for example swimming, group competitors from different categories together, the only separation being based on the severity of the disability.

Medalists

Competitors

The Israeli delegation includes 33 athletes, competing in 11 sports.

Athletics 

Field events

Badminton

Boccia 

Nadav Levi get a ticket for Israel in Individual BC2 events.

Individual

Goalball

Women's tournament
The Israeli women team qualified for the Paralympic Gamess through the 2019 European Championships on 13 October 2019.

Group stage

Quarterfinal

Paracanoeing 

Israel has qualified one athlete in Women's KL2 events.

Qualification Legend: FA=Final A (medal); FB=Final B (non-medal); SF=semifinal

Powerlifting

Rowing

Israel qualified three boats for each of the following rowing classes into the Paralympic regatta. All of them qualified after successfully entering the top seven for men's and women's single sculls and top eight for mixed coxed four at the 2019 World Rowing Championships in Ottensheim, Austria.

Qualification Legend: FA=Final A (medal); FB=Final B (non-medal); R=Repechage

Shooting 

Israel paralympic shooter, Doron Shaziri earned a quate for Israel after he won a silver medal in the R7 - Men's 50m Rifle 3 Positions event at the 2018 World Shooting Para Sport World Cup. Yuliya Chernoy earned a quate for Israel after she won a bronze medal in the R6 - Mixed 50m Rifle Prone SH1 event at the 2019 World Shooting Para Sport Championships.

Swimming

Israel have qualified two quota in Swimming at the 2019 World Para Swimming Championships after Mark Malyar won a gold medal at the 400 meter freestyle swim in the S7 disability class and set a new world record (4:33 minutes) and Ami Omer Dadaon won a silver medal. Israel qualified another six quota after achieving the MQS.

Israel won eight medals in swimming events, and for the first time in the Paralympics, Israeli swimmers won gold medals. Two golds and one bronze medal were won by Mark Malyar and he set two new world records, in the men’s 200-meter individual medley and the 400m freestyle S7. Iyad Shalabi, in his fourth appearance at the Paralympics, became the first Arab-Israeli to win a medal in the Olympics or Paralympics for Israel, winning two gold medals. Ami Omer Dadaon won three medals, two gold and one silver, and set a Paralympic record in the men’s 50-meter freestyle S4 category and a world record in the 200m freestyle S4. 

Men

Women

Table tennis

Israel entered one athlete into the table tennis competition at the games by the Bipartite Commission Invitation.

Women

Wheelchair tennis

Israel qualified four players entries for wheelchair tennis. Two of them qualified by the world rankings, while two of them qualified by receiving bipartite commission invitation allocation quotas.

Men

See also
Israel at the Paralympics
Israel at the 2020 Summer Olympics

References

Nations at the 2020 Summer Paralympics
2020
2021 in Israeli sport